Imamichi (written: 今道) is a Japanese surname. Notable people with the surname include:

, Japanese philosopher
, Japanese musician

Japanese-language surnames